Calochortus  is a genus of flowering plants in the lily family. The group includes herbaceous, perennial and bulbous species, all native to North America (primarily the Western United States).

The genus Calochortus includes mariposas (or mariposa lilies) with open wedge-shaped petals, globe lilies and fairy lanterns with globe-shaped flowers, and cat's ears and star tulips with erect pointed petals. The word Calochortus is derived from Greek and means "beautiful grass".

Description
Calochortus flowers have six tepals. Unlike most other Liliaceae, Calochortus tepals are in two series that differ in size and color. The outer three are generally narrower and more sepal-like, while the inner three are larger, usually with bright marks at the base.  They may be described as petals. The flowers are borne on a stem that arises from a bulb, generally in the spring or early summer.  Flowers can be white, yellow, pink, purple, bluish, or streaked. The insides of the petals are often very 'hairy'. These hairs, along with the nectaries, are often used in distinguishing species from each other.

Species 

Calochortus albus white globelily - CA, Baja California
Calochortus amabilis short lily - CA 
Calochortus ambiguus doubting mariposa lily - UT AZ NM Sonora
Calochortus amoenus purple globelily - CA 
Calochortus apiculatus pointedtip mariposa lily - British Columbia, Alberta, WA OR ID MT WY
Calochortus argillosus - CA
Calochortus aureus golden mariposa lily - UT CO AZ NM
Calochortus balsensis - Oaxaca, Guerrero
Calochortus barbatus yellow globe lily - from Chihuahua to Oaxaca
Calochortus bruneaunis Bruneau mariposa lily - CA OR NV UT ID MT
Calochortus catalinae Santa Catalina mariposa lily — (threatened by development) CA 
Calochortus cernuus - Morelos
Calochortus ciscoensis - UT 
Calochortus clavatus clubhair mariposa lily - CA 
Calochortus clavatus var. avius -rare, 
Calochortus clavatus var. gracilis
Calochortus clavatus ssp. clavatus
Calochortus clavatus ssp. pallidus
Calochortus clavatus ssp. recurvifolius — rare 
Calochortus coeruleus beavertail grass - CA 
Calochortus concolor goldenbowl mariposa lily - CA, Baja California
Calochortus coxii Cox's mariposa lily - OR 
Calochortus dunnii Dunn's mariposa lily  — rare - CA, Baja California
Calochortus elegans northwestern mariposa lily; star tulip - CA OR WA ID MT
Calochortus elegans var. elegans elegant mariposa lily
Calochortus elegans var. nanus
Calochortus elegans var. oreophilus elegant mariposa lily
Calochortus elegans var. selwayensis Selway mariposa lily
Calochortus eurycarpus white mariposa lily - OR WA NV ID MT WY
Calochortus excavatus Inyo mariposa lily — (threatened by groundwater development) - CA 
Calochortus exilis - Hidalgo
Calochortus fimbriatus late-blooming mariposa lily  — rare - CA 
Calochortus flexuosus winding mariposa lily - CA NV UT CO AZ NM Baja California, Sonora
Calochortus foliosus - Michoacán
Calochortus fuscus - Mexico
Calochortus greenei Green's mariposa lily  — rare - CA OR 
Calochortus ghiesbreghtii - Mexico, Guatemala
Calochortus gunnisonii Gunnison's mariposa lily - ID MT WY SD NE CO UT AZ NM
Calochortus gunnisonii var. gunnisonii
Calochortus gunnisonii var. perpulcher
Calochortus hartwegii - Aguascalientes, Nayarit, Jalisco
Calochortus howellii Howell's mariposa lily - OR 
†Calochortus indecorus Sexton Mountain mariposa lily - OR - extinct
Calochortus invenustus plain mariposa lily - CA NV 
Calochortus kennedyi desert mariposa lily - CA NV AZ Sonora, Chihuahua
Calochortus kennedyi var. kennedyi
Calochortus kennedyi var. munzii
Calochortus leichtlinii smokey mariposa - CA NV OR 
Calochortus longibarbatus longbeard mariposa lily - CA OR WA 
Calochortus longibarbatus var. longibarbatus —  (threatened by grazing)
Calochortus longibarbatus var. peckii
Calochortus luteus yellow mariposa lily - CA 
Calochortus lyallii Lyall's mariposa lily - WA, British Columbia
Calochortus macrocarpus sagebrush mariposa lily - CA NV OR WA ID MT, British Columbia
Calochortus macrocarpus var. macrocarpus
Calochortus macrocarpus var. maculosus Nez Perce mariposa lily
Calochortus marcellae - Nuevo León, Coahuila, Tamaulipas
Calochortus mendozae - Querétaro, San Luis Potosí
Calochortus minimus Sierran mariposa lily - CA 
†Calochortus monanthus Shasta River mariposa lily — CA (presumed extinct)
Calochortus monophyllus yellow startulip - CA OR 
Calochortus nigrescens - Oaxaca 
Calochortus nitidus broadfruit mariposa lily - WA OR ID 
Calochortus nudus naked mariposa lily - CA OR 
Calochortus nuttallii sego lily, (state flower of Utah)  - ND SD NE MT ID CO UT NV AZ NM
Calochortus obispoensis San Luis mariposa lily - CA 
Calochortus palmeri  Palmer's mariposa lily - CA 
Calochortus palmeri var. munzii Munz's mariposa lily 
Calochortus palmeri var. palmeri  — rare
Calochortus panamintensis Panamint Mountain mariposa lily  — rare ca NV 
Calochortus persistens Siskiyou mariposa lily  — rare - CA OR 
Calochortus plummerae Plummer's mariposa lily  — rare - CA 
Calochortus pringlei - Morelos, Puebla, Jalisco, Oaxaca
Calochortus pulchellus Mount Diablo globelily - CA 
Calochortus raichei Cedars mariposa lily - CA 
Calochortus simulans San Luis Obispo mariposa lily - CA 
Calochortus spatulatus - Mexico
Calochortus splendens splendid mariposa lily - CA, Baja California
Calochortus striatus alkali mariposa lily - CA NV 
Calochortus subalpinus subalpine mariposa lily, Cascade mariposa lily, cat's ear lily - WA OR 
Calochortus superbus superb mariposa - CA 
Calochortus syntrophus Callahan's mariposa lily - CA 
Calochortus tiburonensis Tiburon mariposa - CA 
Calochortus tolmiei Tolmie's star-tulip, hairy pussy ears  - CA OR WA 
Calochortus umbellatus Oakland mariposa lily - CA 
Calochortus umpquaensis Umpqua mariposa lily - OR 
Calochortus uniflorus mariposa 'Cupido' - CA OR 
Calochortus venustulus - Mexico
Calochortus venustus butterfly mariposa, white mariposa - CA 
Calochortus vestae Vesta's mariposa, Coast Range mariposa - CA 
Calochortus weedii Weed's mariposa - CA, Baja Calilfornia
Calochortus westonii Shirley Meadow star-tulip, Weston's mariposa - CA

Distribution and habitat
The genus Calochortus includes approximately 70 species distributed from southwestern British Columbia, through California and Mexico, to northern Guatemala and eastwards to New Mexico, Nebraska and the Dakotas.  Calochortus is the most widely dispersed genus of Liliaceae on the North American Pacific Coast. Of these, 28 species are endemic to California.

In 1998, T.B. Patterson conducted a phylogenetic analysis of the genus, dividing it into seven main clades. The study indicated highly localized speciation, so that different clades were strongly linked to specific habitats, as follows: 
Mariposas: dry grasslands, open chaparral, semideserts
Star-tulips: wet meadows
Cat's ears: montane woodlands
Fairy lanterns: oak woodlands, closed forests.

Uses
Culinary
The bulbs of many species were eaten by Native Americans. These bulbs were eaten raw or gathered in the fall and boiled, and the flower buds when young and fresh. They were eaten by the Mormon settlers between 1853 and 1858 when famine threatened new immigrants in the Great Salt Lake Valley, due to crop failures.

Native Americans called Calochortus "sego". They used it  as food, in ceremonies and as a traditional medicinal plant.

Cultivation
Some Calochortus species are cultivated as ornamental plants by specialty nurseries and botanic gardens to sell.  The bulbs are planted for their flowers, in traditional, native plant, and wildlife gardens; in rock gardens; and in potted container gardens for those needing unwatered Summer dormancy.

See also

 List of plants known as lily

Notes

References 

Treatment from the Jepson Manual (TJM93)
 Gerritsen, Mary E and Parsons, R. Calochortus. Mariposa Lilies and Their Relatives. Timber Press, 2007.
 Pacific Bulb Society

External links

Calflora Database: Calochortus — all species native to California.
photos by Mark Egger, Flickriver search for Calochortus many photos of many species
Jepson Manual (TJM93): Key to California Calochortus species
Genus overview, Key to North American species
  Gallery of Photos. US and Mexican Calochortus Species and Natural Hybrids

 
Liliaceae genera
Flora of the Western United States
Flora of Mexico
Flora of Western Canada
Flora of California
Taxa named by Frederick Traugott Pursh
Garden plants of North America